John Augustus Fritchey, M.D. (September 25, 1857 - August 25, 1916) was an American physician and politician, who served three terms as Mayor of Harrisburg, Pennsylvania. The son of a middle-class butcher, Fritchey attended Harrisburg Academy and the University of Pennsylvania School of Medicine. Endorsed by the Harrisburg Patriot during the 1887 Harrisburg Mayoral Race (hailed as a "young man of ability and integrity"), he would eventually be found as responsible for missing government funds. From his first term, he established the Harrisburg Bureau of Police and ambulance services, but was reported as extorting speakeasies, gambling houses and brothels for police protection. Fritchey was also notable for providing illegal abortions, and women from out of town would ride the train into Harrisburg to receive the procedures in secrecy. When Mira Lloyd Dock presented her ideas for the City Beautiful movement, he showed tepid support, leading J. Horace McFarland to refer to him as "the unspeakable Fritchey." Despite private feuds, Fritchey was popular amongst all classes, including the largely Republican city at the time, and won his third reelection by a large majority. Fritchey was also elected multiple times as chairman for The Dauphin County Democratic Committee and was considered well known in national and state politics.

References

1857 births
1916 deaths
19th-century American politicians
Mayors of Harrisburg, Pennsylvania